Gin is a ghost town in Clarke County, Mississippi, United States.
A post office operated under the name Gin from 1905 to 1913.

References

Former populated places in Clarke County, Mississippi
Former populated places in Mississippi